Halifax Bay Wetlands is a national park at Halifax Bay in Queensland, Australia, 1179 km northwest of Brisbane.

The one island in the park is Pandora Reef. This place is known as a spawning ground for many species of fish, such as barramundi, mangrove jack, grunter and salmon.

See also

 Protected areas of Queensland

References 

National parks of Queensland
Protected areas established in 1994
North Queensland